Privolzhsky is an urban locality (an urban-type settlement) in Volzhsky District of the Mari El Republic, Russia. As of the 2010 Census, its population was 4,159.

History
It was founded in 1980.

Administrative and municipal status
Within the framework of administrative divisions, the urban-type settlement of Privolzhsky, together with two rural localities, is incorporated within Volzhsky District as Privolzhsky Urban-Type Settlement (an administrative division of the district). As a municipal division, Privolzhsky Urban-Type Settlement is incorporated within Volzhsky Municipal District as Privolzhsky Urban Settlement.

References

Notes

Sources

Urban-type settlements in the Mari El Republic